The 2019 Overwatch League season was the second season of the Overwatch League (OWL), an esport based on the video game Overwatch. The league expanded from 12 teams from the inaugural season to 20 teams. Of the eight new teams, two were from the United States, two were from Canada, one was from France, and three were from China.

The season began on February 14, 2019, and ended on August 25. Postseason play began in late August. The San Francisco Shock won the Grand Finals over the Vancouver Titans to become the league champions.

League changes

Expansion 

The Overwatch League initially launched with twelve teams in the 2018 season. During this season, Blizzard stated it planned to expand out the league to add six teams, ideally gaining more teams in European and Asian regions, and started meeting with potential owners in March 2018. By September 2018, Blizzard confirmed it had signed eight additional teams based in Atlanta, Guangzhou, Hangzhou, Toronto, Paris, Washington D.C., Vancouver, and Chengdu, bringing the total team count to twenty. The eight teams were distributed evenly between the two Divisions, with the North American East Coast and European teams joining the Atlantic Division, and the Chinese and North American West Coast teams added to the Pacific Division.

Schedule 
The 2019 season's revised schedule format was announced on December 12, 2018. The season kept the four-stage format that was used in the 2018 season, though only the first three stages had playoffs, while the fourth stage's playoffs were replaced by a six-team play-in tournament to determine the final two postseason teams. The top six season playoff teams were determined by the same way they were in 2018; the top two teams from each division and the next four teams, regardless of division. The season playoffs were contested in a double-elimination tournament. Teams played 28 regular season games instead of 40, with the league citing players' mental health and additional chances to interact with their home cities as reasons for the change. Each stage still lasted five weeks, though the break between stages increased from one week to two weeks (except for the break between stages 2 and 3, which was four weeks due to the league's All-Star Weekend). Each week featured three to four games on Thursday and Friday and four games on Saturday and Sunday, totaling either fourteen or sixteen games per week, up from twelve in 2018. Teams played zero, one, or two matches per week. The stage playoffs doubled in size from 2018, expanding to eight teams, up from the four team system introduced in 2018's third stage. The top team from each division held the first and second seed, followed by the next six teams, regardless of division.

The Grand Finals were held at the Wells Fargo Center in Philadelphia, Pennsylvania on September 29, 2019.

Prize pool 
All eight teams who qualified for each Stage Playoffs earned at least $25,000. Each stage champion earned $200,000 (up from $100,000 in 2018), while the amount earned by the runners-up quadrupled from 2018 to $100,000. Third and fourth place teams earned $50,000 while fifth through eighth place teams earned $25,000. For the postseason earnings, the Grand Champion team will earn $1.1 million (up from $1 million), second place will earn $600,000, third place will earn $450,000, fourth place will earn $350,000, fifth and sixth place will earn $300,000, and seventh and eighth place will earn $200,000.

Player contracts 
The season's free agency signing window opened to expansion teams on September 10, 2018, and closed on October 7, the day before the window for all teams opened. Each teams had to sign at least 12 players by December 1.

The 2019 season was also the first in which two-way contracts were in effect. Players signed to these contracts primarily played for their OWL team's academy team that played in Overwatch Contenders. They were unable to play in more than two OWL matches in a stage, nor could they play in an OWL match and a Contenders match in the same week. These players counted towards the OWL team's 12-player limit.

Venues 
Though most matches were still played at the 350-seat Blizzard Arena, the 2019 season introduced three "Homestand Weeks," which took place in three Overwatch League cities. These were held as practice runs for the planned expansion of the Overwatch League into true home-and-away formats for the 2020 season, seeing teams travel across the globe to compete. The fourth week of Stage 2 was held at the Allen Event Center in Allen, Texas and was hosted by the Dallas Fuel. The fifth week of Stage 3 was held at the Cobb Energy Performing Arts Centre in Cumberland, Georgia and was hosted by the Atlanta Reign. The fifth week of Stage 4, dubbed "Kit Kat Rivalry Weekend," was held at The Novo by Microsoft in Los Angeles, California and was hosted by the Los Angeles Valiant.

Broadcasting 
All matches were broadcast on the Overwatch League's website and through Major League Gaming (owned by Blizzard), and by third-party broadcaster Twitch. On the first day of the 2018 season playoffs, Disney and Blizzard announced a multi-year partnership that would bring OWL and other organized Overwatch competitive events to ESPN, Disney XD, and ABC, starting with the playoffs and continuing through the 2019 season. On January 28, 2019, Blizzard announced that new dedicated esports channel Esports1, owned by German sports channel Sport1, would be broadcasting Overwatch League events in Germany, Switzerland, and Austria.

Regular season 
A team's standing was based on their overall match win–loss record, with ties broken by map differential, head-to-head map record, and head-to-head match record, in that order. If a tie that affects the qualification for Stage or Postseason playoffs still cannot be broken, the teams were to play a tiebreaker match.

The season playoff teams consisted of the two division winners, four wild card teams with the best regular season records regardless of division, and the top two teams from the play-in tournament.

Overall standings

Stage 1 
Stage 1 ran from February 14 to March 17, 2019, with stage playoffs taking place from March 21–24, 2019. The two division leaders, and the following top six teams, regardless of division, in the Stage 1 standings qualified for the Stage 1 Playoffs. The division winners were awarded the top two seeds, while the remaining teams received seeds three through eight based on their Stage 1 records. All matches emanated from the Blizzard Arena in Burbank, California.

At the conclusion of the first stage, both the Fusion and Defiant were tied for third place after considering all tie-breaking resolutions; similarly, the San Francisco Shock and the Seoul Dynasty were tied for sixth place. By league rules, both ties were to broken by an off-stream match. While the sixth-place tie was decided in this manner, the Defiant and Fusion mutually agreed to settle the third-place tie by a coin flip. Due to issues on reporting the coin flip, league commissioner Nate Nanzer stated that the league would not allow teams to decides such ties by one in the future.

Standings

Playoffs

Stage 2
Stage 2 ran from April 4 to May 5, 2019, with stage playoffs taking place from May 9–12. The playoff format did not change from Stage 1. All matches emanated from the Blizzard Arena in Burbank, California, except for the fourth week of play, which took place at the Allen Event Center in Allen, Texas – the first of three "Homestand Weeks" of the season. This stage's Homestand Week was hosted by Dallas Fuel.

The second stage was the first in which assault map Paris was available for play. It was also the introduction of new support character Baptiste into professional play. Baptiste was designed by Blizzard as to disrupt a three-tank, three-support composition (frequently called GOATS in the game's player base in reference to the non-league team that popularized it) which had been dominating Overwatch metagame for several months prior to the 2019 season and had been frequently used by teams during Stage 1.

Due to the tiebreaking issues in Stage 1, the League updated their tiebreaker rules to include head-to-head records across all stages, strength of schedule, and common opponents records.

Standings

Playoffs

Stage 3
Stage 3 ran from June 6 to July 7, with the stage playoffs taking place from July 11 to 14. The stage marked the first time that assault map Havana was played in the Overwatch League. All matches in the fifth week of Stage 3 were played at the Cobb Energy Performing Arts Centre in Atlanta, Georgia. The event was the second of three "Homestand Weeks" of the season and was hosted by Atlanta Reign. Additionally, the Overwatch League hosted LGBTQ community Pride Day on June 7 at Blizzard Arena.

Standings

Playoffs

Stage 4
Stage 4 ran from July 25 through August 25, with matches in the fifth week taking place at The Novo by Microsoft in Los Angeles as the final "Homestand Week".

Stage 4 introduced a forced 2-2-2 team composition – 2 damage heroes, 2 support heroes, and 2 tank heroes, as a means of eliminating a metagame composition that became dominant in the league made of three tanks and three supports, otherwise known as "GOATS," named after the Overwatch Contenders team that popularized it. This GOATS composition was difficult to counter at this level of play and was deemed boring to watch. Blizzard had tried to introduce changes in the game to better counter GOATS, but these failed to materialize. In the forced 2-2-2 composition, players are role locked at a start of a map, though they are free to switch heroes within that role during the map. Between maps, along with normal player substitutions, players can then swap roles. This change also came to normal quickplay and competitive mode in Overwatch outside of the league at the end of September 2019.

Standings

Postseason

Play-in tournament 
The play-in tournament is a single-elimination tournament that took place August 30–31. Each match were first-to-four maps, with the higher seed selecting the first map and the loser of each subsequent map selecting the next. The winners of each quarterfinal match advanced to the semifinals, where they faced either the seventh- or eighth-seeded team, depending on their own seed. The winners of the semifinals qualified for the season playoffs and were seeded according to their regular season records.

Bracket

Playoffs 

Eight teams competed in the OWL Playoffs – a double-elimination tournament – from September 5 to 29. The winner of each round of the Playoffs was determined by a single-match, where each match winner was determined by which team wins four maps. The final two teams remaining in the tournament advanced to the Grand Finals, which took place at Wells Fargo Center in Philadelphia, Pennsylvania on September 29.

Bracket

Notable events

Shanghai Dragons win first match 
In the 2018 season, the Shanghai Dragons failed to win a match, going 0–40 throughout the regular season. The franchise released eight of their eleven players going into the 2019 season. The Dragons lost their first two matches of the 2019 regular season, bringing their loss streak to 42 matches — the longest loss streak in professional sports history at the time. On February 22, 2019, the Dragons defeated the Boston Uprising, giving the franchise their first win.

Sale of the Houston Outlaws 
On June 12, 2019, Immortals Gaming Club (IGC), the parent company of Immortals and Los Angeles Valiant, acquired Infinite Esports, the parent company of Houston Outlaws and OpTic Gaming, marking the first sale of any Overwatch League franchise. Both Riot Games and Activision Blizzard approved the sale. By OWL rules, one company may not own more than one OWL franchise, so IGC had to operate the Valiant and Outlaws as entirely separate entities, with oversight by OWL representatives, until IGC sold the Outlaws. In November 2019, IGC sold the Outlaws to the Beasley Media Group.

Awards

Individual awards

Role Stars

All-Star Game 

The 2019 Overwatch League All-Star Game was the Overwatch League's second edition of an all-star game that involved the All-Star players of the league. The game was played on May 16, 2019, and was the culmination of the league's All-Star Weekend, a two-day event that consisted of the Talent Takedown, a Widowmaker 1v1 tournament, and the All-Star Arcade. All of the events were played at Blizzard Arena in Burbank, California. The game was televised by ESPN2 and streamed live on Twitch.

Winnings
By League rules, at least 50% of these winnings are split among the team's members, the remaining going to the team's owner.

Stage 1 Playoffs

Stage 2 Playoffs

Stage 3 Playoffs

Season Playoffs

References

External links 
 
 

 
Overwatch